Tipping Point is a British television Quiz Show that is broadcast on ITV, although repeats are shown on W which is part of the BBC. First airing on 2 July 2012, the programme is presented by Ben Shephard and features three contestants (originally four before Series 12) answering questions on the subject of general knowledge to win counters which they use on a large coin pusher arcade-style machine. Only the winner at the end has a chance to take home any money; the others leave with nothing except any non-cash prizes they may have won during the game.

Gameplay

The machine consists of two shelves filled with flat circular counters; the upper shelf slowly extends and retracts, whilst the lower one is stationary. The rear face of the machine is divided into four drop zones, each of which contains a pegboard similar to those found in pachinko machines. Contestants answer questions to win counters, then choose a drop zone and press their buzzer to release one counter at a time into that zone. The goal is to have the counters land flat on the upper shelf so that its retraction will cause them to push other counters over its front edge, leading them in turn to push still others off the lower shelf and into a collection trough referred to as the "win zone". Contestants win £50 for each counter that drops into the win zone during their turn. Any counters that bounce out of the machine and land on either the floor or the lip of the win zone during a turn are still credited toward that contestant's score.

Three "mystery counters" were introduced in Series 2; each are labelled with a question mark and as of Series 9, they are respectively coloured green. If a mystery counter enters the win zone, the contestant in control of the machine wins a prize (e.g. monthly flower bouquets or weekend holiday, etc.) which is theirs to keep regardless of the game's final outcome and if two or all three mystery counters fall on the same drop, they win that many prizes. Two "double counters" were introduced in Series 5; each are labelled with a x2 and as of Series 9, they are respectively coloured yellow. If a double counter enters the win zone, the value of all counters that land in the win zone on that same drop is doubled and if both double counters fall on the same drop, the total value is quadrupled. Typically, the game begins with one counter of each type on the lower shelf and the other ones on the upper shelf.

Counters that enter the win zone when the machine is not in play are "ambient drops" and are removed from the machine with no effect on scoring (except in the Final Round). If such a drop occurs after a contestant has chosen a drop zone but before they have pressed the buzzer to release a counter, they are given the option to play from that zone or select a different one. Any mystery or double counters that fall into the win zone as an ambient drop are put back in the machine as near as possible to the position they occupied before falling.

A "ghost drop" occurs when a counter drifts forward as it falls through a drop zone and its face makes contact with the clear plastic sheet covering the front of the zone. The resulting friction can greatly slow the counter or even stop its descent altogether for a very short period of time. Ghost drops, mistimed drops and unexpected bounces can lead to a counter landing on the upper shelf so that it partially overlaps or "rides" on others; such plays rarely trigger falls into the win zone and can adversely affect a contestant's turn.

For the first 11 Regular series, with four contestants per game, the lowest-scoring contestant at the end of each round is eliminated from the game and forfeits all their money. In the event of a tie for low score, a sudden-death toss-up is used to break the tie. A correct buzz-in answer allows the contestant to advance while a wrong answer eliminates them. If more than two contestants are tied for low score, the toss-ups continue until either one has been eliminated or all but one have advanced. In Series 12, with only three contestants per game, eliminations occur only at the end of Rounds 2 and 3.

If a contestant is visually impaired, they are allowed to have a helper stationed backstage, who can see the machine on a monitor and give advice through an audio earpiece as to where and when to play each counter. However, the helper may not assist in answering the questions.

Round 1
Each contestant is given three counters and a series of toss-up general knowledge questions is asked and the first contestant to buzz-in may answer. A contestant to give the correct answer may either play one of their own counters or force an opponent to play one instead, based on their judgement of how likely the machine is to pay out on that particular turn. Once a contestant has used all of their counters, they may not answer any more questions and once there is only one contestant who still has any counters, they don’t need to buzz-in, but must continue answering correctly in order to use their counters.

A contestant who gives a wrong answer or no answer at any time loses one counter, which is placed into a penalty pot and at the end of the round, the penalty pot is put at stake on one final toss-up question which is open to all the contestants. The contestant to give the correct answer wins all the counters that are in the penalty pot, while a contestant who gives a wrong answer gets frozen out and a new question is asked to the other contestants. If no contestants give a wrong answer, there is no penalty pot and the round ends once all the contestants have each used the three they were given.

Round 2
Each contestant answers 45 seconds (30 seconds in Series 1 to 11) of rapid-fire general knowledge questions and receives a counter for each correct answer. Once the time is up, the contestant uses the counters they earned in an attempt to win more money. The contestant in the lead after Round 1 decides who will play first and then after the chosen contestant has finished their turn, the higher-scoring of the two remaining contestants decides who will play next. In case of a tie before their turn, the contestant who gave a correct answer in Round 1 first has priority.

Round 3
The two remaining contestants are asked six questions; three directed to each contestant alternately. After hearing the question, the contestant in control may either answer or pass to their opponent. The contestant who answered receives a counter for a correct answer, while their opponent receives one for a wrong answer. Each counter is used as soon as it is earned. The contestant in the lead after Round 2 decides who will have the first question. If the contestants are tied going into this round, the contestant leading at the beginning of Round 2 has priority.

Final
The contestant is given a jackpot counter (larger than the others used in the game and coloured gold with a red star) and chooses a zone from which to drop it into the machine. The goal of this round is to win a £10,000 jackpot by getting the counter into the win zone. In order to do so, the contestant must earn counters by answering one multiple-choice question from each of six categories, in any order desired. Questions have three answer options and may be played for one, two or three counters, with higher-value questions being more difficult. A correct answer awards the chosen number of counters, which the contestant immediately plays into the machine.

Counters that enter the win zone during this round are worth £50 apiece, including any that fall during the initial playing of the jackpot counter and the mystery and double counters are still in effect. Once the jackpot counter is in the machine, ambient drops are not voided, but are added to the contestant's winnings; however, they are voided before the jackpot counter goes in and after the last category has been used. If the jackpot counter enters the win zone, the contestant's cash total is augmented to £10,000. As of Series 8, the jackpot is doubled to £20,000 if a double counter falls on the same drop in which it is won. 

If the contestant fails to recover the jackpot counter after using up all six categories, they may either trade the accumulated money for three more counters or end the game at this point and keep all winnings. If the contestant trades, all the counters except the jackpot counter become worthless and they forfeit all the money they had if the jackpot counter remains in the machine; however, the jackpot can still be increased to £20,000 with a double counter and the mystery prizes will only count if they fall with the jackpot. If the contestant ends the game and the jackpot counter is on the bottom shelf, they play the three additional counters to see if they would have been able to win the jackpot by trading.

Regardless of the outcome in this round, the contestant keeps all mystery prizes they have won at any point in the game.

Tipping Point: Lucky Stars and Specials

A series of 12 celebrity episodes under the title Tipping Point: Lucky Stars aired on ITV beginning on 9 June 2013 where celebrities are playing on behalf of a selected charity. The programme was shown in a primetime slot. Three further series were then aired; Series 2 in Summer 2014, Series 3 in Autumn 2016 and Series 4 in Autumn 2017. A Christmas special aired on 29 December 2018 ahead of Series 5 in Summer 2019 and a Christmas Special on 25 December 2019. Series 6 commenced in Autumn 2020 and a Christmas Special aired on 24 December 2020. Series 7 then aired throughout Spring 2021 ahead of a Soccer Aid Special on 2 September 2021 and a Christmas Special on 24 December 2021. Series 8 then began airing in Spring 2022 with a Soccer Aid Special on 9 June 2022 and a Christmas Special on 17 December 2022.

The celebrity episodes feature some changes to the ordinary format:
 All cash values are doubled (normal and mystery counters are worth £100 and the jackpot is £20,000) (except for the Soccer Aid Specials).
 There are no double counters in the machine (except for the Soccer Aid Specials).
 Mystery counters award either a joke prize (e.g. a Tipping Point themed T-shirt or a Tipping Point themed backpack, etc.), a cash bonus or a question relevant to the contestant in control that allows them to play a bonus counter by giving a correct answer. In the Soccer Aid Specials, the prizes are donations to help people in need and the counters have the Soccer Aid logo on them instead of the question mark.
 In Round 2, the time limit is 30 seconds except for the Soccer Aid Specials.
 The losing contestants after Rounds 2 and 3 still take home the money they have accumulated for their chosen charities and if a contestant is eliminated with a total of £0, a donation is still made to their charity.
 In the Final, if the contestant takes the trade at the end but fails, their charity still receives £1,000.
 There is no montage of their overall gameplay shown if they win the jackpot.
 All episodes (except ones filmed during the COVID-19 pandemic) have a live audience.

Tipping Point: Best Ever Finals
Tipping Point: Best Ever Finals is a half hour spin-off that is shown at times when the Regular or Lucky Stars episodes are neither first broadcast nor repeated (e.g. during ITV Horse Racing coverage). The programme showcases the best and most dramatic jackpot finales from previous episodes of Tipping Point. As of Series 2, they also included some dramatic jackpot Finals from previous episodes of the primetime celebrity spin-off Tipping Point: Lucky Stars.

Transmissions

Regular

Lucky Stars

Specials

Best Ever Finals

International Transmissions
  Australia – the Nine Network first broadcast the regular series on 2 December 2019. Episodes air at 3:00 pm weekdays (except in Western Australia where it airs at 4:00 pm weekdays) in direct competition with rival ITV-produced game show The Chase on the Seven Network. A repeat of the same day's episode is shown sometime after midnight the following day. For a brief period in January 2021, episodes also aired in prime time, at 7:30 pm Saturdays.
  Ireland – Virgin Media Two airs episodes Monday to Friday at 4:00pm and 5:00pm.
  New Zealand – TVNZ airs episodes of the original British version as well as its celebrity Lucky Stars counterpart Monday to Saturday at 10:00am and Monday to Friday at 3:00pm.

Merchandise
The official Tipping Point app for iOS was released by Barnstorm Games on 30 March 2014. The Android version was later released on 3 April 2014. An electronic board game based on the show was released in 2015 by John Adams under its Ideal Games brand. Another Tipping Point app was released in 2020 called Tipping Point Blast!

References

External Links
 
 
 

2010s British game shows
2020s British television series
2020s British game shows
2012 British television series debuts
ITV game shows
English-language television shows
Television series by Banijay